B20 may refer to:

Aircraft
 Blackburn B-20, a 1940 experimental aircraft
 Boeing Y1B-20, A Boeing experimental heavy bomber
 Douglas A-20 Havoc, designated the ZB-20 at the end of its life

Roads
 B20 motorway (Spain), a ring road around Barcelona in Catalonia
 B20 road (Cyprus)
 Bundesstraße 20, a German road

Other uses
 B20 international business summit, an international summit meeting of delegates from business groups around the world
 B20 (biodiesel), a mixture composed of 20% of biodiesel with 80% of diesel
 B20 (bronze), bell bronze or bell metal, a kind of bronze used in bells and cymbals
 B20 (New York City bus) serving Brooklyn
 Berezin B-20, a 20 mm caliber autocannon used by Soviet aircraft in World War II
 Honda B20 engine
 Volvo B20 engine
 20 amp, type B – a standard circuit breaker current rating
 Bravo Two Zero, an eight-man British Special Air Service patrol that was tasked with finding Iraqi Scud missile launchers during the Gulf War
 The designation number assigned to the coupe version of the Lancia Aurelia motorcar, produced between 1951 and 1958
 The "Business 20", an offshoot of the G20, which hopes to present a forum for the world's largest companies to discuss global issues
 Sicilian Defense, Encyclopaedia of Chess Openings code
 Boron-20 (B-20 or 20B), an isotope of boron
 Burroughs B20, a line of microcomputers

See also
 B2O:
 Boron monoxide, a chemical compound with the symbol B2O
 b2o: an online journal, an American peer-reviewed online journal